Assalamualaikum North Oil Company (NOC) is situated in Kirkuk, Iraq. 

The North Oil Company is one of the 16 companies comprising the Iraqi Ministry of Oil. Headquartered in Kirkuk, its boundaries extend from the northern borders to the 32.5 degree parallel, just south of Baghdad.

External links 

 http://www.noc.oil.gov.iq

Oil and gas companies of Iraq